B. Espen Eckbo is an American economist, currently the Tuck Centennial Professor at Dartmouth College.

References

Living people
Dartmouth College faculty
American economists
University of Rochester alumni
1952 births